M24, M.24 or M-24 may refer to:

Military
 HMS M24, a Royal Navy M15 class monitor
 HMS M24, Royal Swedish Navy ship, (see List of mine warfare vessels of the Royal Swedish Navy)
 M24 Chaffee, an American light tank
 M24 mine, an American landmine
 Mauser M24
 M24 series, a line of Mauser battle rifles used by Yugoslavian military forces.
 FN Model 24, a Belgian version of design
 M24 Sniper Weapon System, a sniper rifle
 M24 trailer, WW2, US Army ammunition trailer
 M-24, a Japanese midget submarine that participated in the attack on Sydney Harbour in the Second World War
 Model 24 grenade
 M-24 20mm Aircraft cannon, variant in the United States of Hispano-Suiza HS.404

Aviation
 Grigorovich M-24, Soviet flying boat
 Macchi M.24, 1924 Italian flying boat
 Magni M-24 Orion, Italian autogyro
 Messerschmitt M 24, German passenger aircraft
 Miles M.24, proposed, WW2, British fighter aircraft
 MSrE M-24, 1938 Hungarian sport aircraft
 PZL M-24 Dromader Super, Polish agricultural aircraft

Other
 M 24, a political movement in the People's Republic of Congo.
 The Mathieu group M24 in the mathematical field of group theory
 M-24 (Michigan highway), a state highway in Michigan
 Messier 24 (M24), a cloud of stars also referred to as the Small Sagittarius Star Cloud
 Olivetti M24, a computer
 M24 (Cape Town), a Metropolitan Route in Cape Town, South Africa
 M24 (Pretoria), a Metropolitan Route in Pretoria, South Africa
 M-24 Alpha, a fictional trinary star system in the original Star Trek episode "The Gamesters of Triskelion"
 M24 (rapper), British rapper